Cook Up a Storm  is a 2017 Hong KongChinese culinary drama film directed by Raymond Yip and starring Nicholas Tse, Jung Yong-hwa, Ge You, Tiffany Tang, Michelle Bai and Anthony Wong. It was released in China on 10 February 2017.

Plot 
The story focuses on two young talented chefs, Sky Ko (Nicholas Tse), a southern-style Chinese chef, and Paul Ahn (Jung Yong-hwa), a Michelin-starred Korean chef trained in France. Both have reasons to climb the culinary ladder—When Sky was ten years old, his father, Mountain Ko (Anthony Wong), left him behind with his friend, Uncle Seven (Ge You), master chef of Seven Restaurant. When asked why, Mountain told Sky that he has no talent as a cook and he would only take him back if he can prove to be a great cook. In reality, Mountain chose to pursue his culinary career over being a father and made the excuse that Sky can't even make a decent bowl of noodles. Because of that, Sky spent twenty years training to become a great chef under Uncle Seven. On the other side, Paul made a promise to his dying father that he would become a great cook. Through that journey, he became a highly successful chef in Europe and decides to run his own restaurant in Hong Kong, Stellar. However, this brings conflict between Paul and Sky.

In an old area of Hong Kong, Sky is now an acclaimed chef at Seven. However, the Li Management Group arrives and starts buying various properties of the old sector, including developing Stellar for Paul. The opening of Stellar proves to be a threat to Sky as these two chefs find themselves fighting for the best ingredients in the markets and maintaining their clientele. Stellar's fine haute cuisine represents a form of aggressive gentrification to the neighborhood and a threat to traditional Chinese cuisine. Their rivalry begins with a challenge for the best fish and the culinary masters agreed to face each other in a culinary duel. Sky makes a traditional salt-baked duck while Paul makes a foie gras sorbet. While both tied in points, the judges declare Paul the victor, as his dish presentation was superior to Sky's bland plating. Although the victory should've solidified Paul's abilities as a cook, things do not go as expected.

It was while celebrating their victory that the manager of Li Group tells Paul he wants to replace him with Mei You (Michelle Bai), sous chef and girlfriend, reasoning that a woman is far more appealing on media than a man. Betrayed and confused, Paul tries to defend his position as head chef, but Mei You exposes his dark secret: Paul has problems tasting certain flavors, especially saltiness. To compensate, he would utilize a notebook containing all his recipes and have others test taste for him. To make matters worse, the manager announces that he and Mei You are romantically involved. Mei You explains to Paul that she never loved him and only sided with him to surpass him. Now that she can take the title as executive chef of Stellar, she doesn't need Paul anymore. Angry that he has lost everything, Paul leaves.

Sky bumps into Paul drinking at an event stadium. Both share their past and troubles, and find mutual respect for each other. Both have a common goal of reaching the culinary top and decided to team up. At Seven, the Li Group wants Uncle Seven to sign away his restaurant, but Uncle Seven refuses. Paul and Sky then appear, announcing their partnership. Paul reminds the manager that as the winner of the competition, he is eligible to compete at the culinary championship, not the Li Group. Surprised by that technicality, the Li Group leaves, hypocritically calling Paul a traitor but not before Paul headbutted the manager in revenge. Sky trains Paul in the ways of Chinese cooking as well as developing Paul's limited palate to help create something new for the competition.

In Macau, at the Studio City Casino, attending the 7th International Culinary Competition, Sky and Paul use both their culinary strengths to compete against four other great chefs. Whoever wins the competition will gain the chance to face the current god of Cookery, Mountain Ko. In this competition, they face a French team, Indian team, a Japanese chef, and Mei You. The French team make a roasted squab dish, the Indian team make a five-flavor curry, the Japanese chef makes koi nigiri, Mei You, impliying that she is in the final stage thanks to manager’s bribery because she hadn’t enrolled to be in the competition, makes an oyster dish with frozen foam, and the duo create a deconstructed mapo tofu. Paul used Sky's sense of taste to help him determine the flavor of the ingredients and Sky relies on Paul's knowledge of molecular science and culinary artistry to create a traditional dish with a modern design. The victory goes to Paul and Sky. In defeat, a shameful Mei You is unable to bring herself to look at Paul's in the eyes for having betrayed him and now once again having to live under Paul's shadow.

Before the final round, Paul points out only one chef can compete against Mountain and he realizes Sky's desire to beat Mountain was a very personal one. Grateful he managed to make it this far with his condition, Paul gives Sky the chance to face his father. In the final competition, Sky finally faces his father, and the judges allow the two to cook anything they want as long as it is considered the highest expression of cooking. While Mountain begins cooking, Sky is distracted by his thoughts about how Seven and the people in the neighborhood mean the most to him. Mountain angrily splashes water at his son's face, demanding that he focus and show him something. Mountain creates a beautiful artistic sugar display of molten lava with a single flower on top. Sky cooks something far more personal: an interpretation of the original noodle dish that Mountain made all those years ago before abandoning Sky. Before the judges can score the dish, Sky gives the bowl of noodles to Mountain, who is moved as he remembers what the noodles represent. Acknowledging his skills as a chef, Mountain calls his son brilliant before Sky walks off the stage. Mountain continues to emotionally eat his noodles, with the victor unclear.

Some time has passed and the people at Seven are getting ready for a poon choi Chinese New Year party with the neighborhood's people. The movie ends with the staff of Seven announcing: We wish you all 2017 a happy rooster year!

Production

Box office 

See also 
 The God of Cookery (1996), a Stephen Chow film

References

External links 
 

2017 films
Films shot in the Czech Republic
Chinese drama films
Hong Kong drama films
Cooking films
Cultural depictions of Elizabeth II
2010s Hong Kong films